The Mary McLeod Bethune Council House National Historic Site preserves the house of Mary McLeod Bethune, located in Northwest Washington, D.C., at 1318 Vermont Avenue NW. National Park Service rangers offer tours of the home, and a video about Bethune's life is shown. It is part of the Logan Circle Historic District.

The house is about five blocks north-northeast of the McPherson Square Washington Metro on the Blue and Orange Lines, and about five blocks south of the U Street Metro station on the Green and Yellow Lines. It is a half block southwest of Logan Circle.

About the site
The site consists of a three-story Victorian townhouse and a two-story carriage house. The carriage house contained the National Archives for Black Women's History,  until 2014, when the National Park Service relocated the records to the National Park Service Museum Resource Center in Landover, Maryland. The archives and a research center at the property are open only by appointment.

Bethune made her home in the townhouse from 1943 to 1955. She purchased it for $15,500. Bethune lived on the third floor, while the National Council of Negro Women occupied the first and second floors. The floor plan of the home remains unchanged from the days when Bethune lived there, and most of the furnishings are original to the home and owned by Bethune and the NCNW.

Becoming a National Historic Site
After Bethune's death, title to the house passed to the National Council of Negro Women, who continued to use it as a headquarters. The Council of the District of Columbia added the site to the D.C. Register of Historic Places in 1975, and began a major restoration of the home, carriage house, and grounds.  Archivist and historian Bettye Collier-Thomas was hired to manage the house, which the NCNW and the city hoped to turn into a research archive and museum. Collier-Thomas turned the museum into a nationally prominent one. After a $150,000 restoration, it opened to the public as a museum in 1981. The American Institute of Architects awarded the facade and first floor restoration effort a historic preservation citation of merit.

The structure was proposed as a National Historic Site the same year, but the National Park Service controversially refused to conduct a study that would make this determination. In 1982, Congress passed legislation requiring the United States Department of the Interior to sign an agreement with the National Council of Negro Women to further restore the house and carriage house, and to establish and maintain a museum and archives in the structure. Although the NCNW would retain ownership of the house, it would "affiliate" with the National Park Service.  The museum and archives were established. Another $1 million in federal money was spent refurbishing, renovating, and conserving the house. By 1987, the federal government was paying $300,000 a year to maintain the house and museum, with the remaining two-thirds of the museum's budget coming from corporations, foundations, and private citizens.  Collier-Thomas left the museum in 1989.

The National Park Service purchased Council House in 1994 and renamed it the Mary McLeod Bethune Council House National Historic Site. The National Council of Negro Women purchased as its new headquarters Sears House—an $8 million, six-story,  historic building at 633 Pennsylvania Avenue NW. The Council House was transferred to the Park Service in October 1996.

References

External links

 National Park Service: Mary McLeod Bethune Council House
 The Mary McLeod Bethune Council House: African American Women Unite for Change, a National Park Service Teaching with Historic Places (TwHP) lesson plan

National Historic Sites in Washington, D.C.
Houses on the National Register of Historic Places in Washington, D.C.
African-American museums in Washington, D.C.
National Capital Parks-East
Italianate architecture in Washington, D.C.
Victorian architecture in Washington, D.C.
Biographical museums in Washington, D.C.
Women's museums in the United States
Protected areas established in 1982
1982 establishments in Washington, D.C.
National Council of Negro Women
African-American historic house museums
District of Columbia Inventory of Historic Sites
Logan Circle (Washington, D.C.)